Supper in the House of Simon the Pharisee may refer to:

Feast in the House of Simon the Pharisee (Rubens)
Supper in the House of Simon the Pharisee (Moretto)